Raymond Goethals (7 October 1921 – 6 December 2004) was a Belgian football coach who led Marseille to victory in the UEFA Champions League final in 1993, becoming the first and only coach to win a European trophy with a French club.

Sometimes nicknamed "Raymond-la-science" ("Raymond-the-Science", previously the nickname of Belgian anarchist and Bonnot gang member Raymond Callemin), "le sorcier" ("the Wizard") or "le magicien" ("the Magician"), Goethals was known for his blunt way of speaking, his habit of mispronouncing players' names and his distinctive Brussels accent. A chain smoker, he was likened to TV police detective Lieutenant Columbo. He was the father of the referee Guy Goethals, who officiated at the 1996 European Championship.

Playing career
Goethals began his career as a goalkeeper in the 1930s with Daring Brussels, making his way through the youth ranks of the club before joining Racing Club Brussel in 1947. He remained at Racing Club Brussel until 1948.

Coaching career

Early career
After a period spent playing for Renaisiènne, he moved into coaching with Hannutois and Waremme, and led Sint-Truiden to second place in the Belgian First Division in 1966.

Belgium national team
Goethals took charge of the Belgium national team in 1968. Belgium succeeded in qualifying for the 1970 World Cup in Mexico, although they were eliminated in the first round of the tournament. Belgium hosted the 1972 European Championship, having knocked out holders Italy in the qualifying stages, and defeated Hungary in the match for third place after losing in the semi-final to eventual tournament winners Germany. That marked Goethals' greatest success as national team coach. He also took great pride in the fact that Belgium had held the emergent Netherlands scoreless in both their meetings in 1974 World Cup qualifying. Belgium completed their qualifying campaign without having conceded a single goal, but lost out to the Netherlands on account of their inferior goal difference.

Return to club coaching
In 1976 Goethals' tenure as coach of the national side ended, and he joined Anderlecht as coach. In his first season, Anderlecht reached the final of the European Cup Winners' Cup, where they lost to German side Hamburger SV, but won the trophy the following year with a comprehensive victory over FK Austria/WAC. After spells coaching in France at Bordeaux and in Brazil with São Paulo, Goethals returned to Belgium to coach Standard Liège. Standard Liège were Belgian champions in 1982 and 1983, and they reached the Cup Winners' Cup Final in 1982, losing to Barcelona, who were at a considerable advantage in that the final was played at their home ground, Camp Nou.

Controversy and Goethals' return to Anderlecht
Standard Liège's 1982 championship win was to become the subject of great controversy in 1984. Seemingly preoccupied with winning his first Belgian title, Goethals had suggested and initiated the bribing of the Waterschei players prior to the teams' meeting in the final match of the season, in order to secure championship honours for Standard Liège and ensure that none of his players would miss their European final against Barcelona through injury. Goethals was forced to resign in the wake of the scandal, and he moved to Portugal to take charge of Vitória Guimarães. He then returned to Belgium to coach Racing Jet de Bruxelles before a second spell in charge of Anderlecht, where he won Belgian Cup trophy in 1989. Bordeaux again recruited Goethals, and they finished runners-up in the French championship in 1989–90 behind Marseille. Approaching 70 years of age, Goethals' greatest triumph as a coach was yet to come.

Marseille
In 1990, Goethals was named coach of Olympique de Marseille and was entrusted with the task of leading the club to European Cup success. In his first season, the club narrowly missed out on European glory, losing on penalties in the European Cup Final to Red Star Belgrade. There was recognition for Goethals' coaching abilities, as he was voted 1991 European Coach of the Year. In 1993, Marseille again reached the European Cup final, where they defeated favourites A.C. Milan with a headed goal by Basile Boli. Having achieved his primary objective at Marseille, Goethals left the club.

Marseille were later stripped of their 1993 French championship when it emerged that three Valenciennes players had been offered money to underperform in a crucial match against Marseille. The club were not allowed to defend their European title as a result, and were punished with relegation to the French second division.

Retirement
Goethals' coaching career ended at Anderlecht in season 1995–96, but he remained in demand as a television analyst for his insights into football. He died of bowel cancer aged 83. In 2005, the year following his death, he was voted 38th in De Grootste Belg, a Flemish television programme based on the BBC's 100 Greatest Britons. The number 2 stand at F.C. Brussels' home ground, Edmond Machtens Stadium, was renamed in honour of Goethals in late 2005. He remains today as the oldest winning manager of UEFA Champions League

As a manager

Honours

Manager 
Anderlecht
 European Cup Winners' Cup: 1977–78, runner-up 1976–77
 European Super Cup: 1976, 1978
 Belgian Cup: 1987–88, 1988-89, runner-up: 1976-77
 Amsterdam Tournament: 1976
Tournoi de Paris: 1977
 Jules Pappaert Cup: 1977
 Belgian Sports Merit Award: 1978
 Bruges Matins: 1988

Sao Paulo 
 Campeonato Brasileiro Série A: runner-up: 1981

Standard Liège
 Belgian First Division: 1981–82, 1982–83
 Belgian Super Cup: 1981, 1983
 European Cup Winners' Cup: runner-up 1981–82
Intertoto Cup Group Winners: 1982, 1984

Bordeaux 
 French Division 1: runner-up: 1989-90

Marseille

 French Division 1: 1990–91, 1991–92
 UEFA Champions League: 1992–93, runner-up: 1990-91
Coupe de France: runner-up: 1990-91

Belgium
UEFA European Championship: third place 1972Individual
 Panchina d'Oro: 1990–91
 Panchina d'Argento: 1991–92
 Onze d'Or Coach of the Year: 1991, 1993'''
 : From 2011
Golden Shoe Lifetime Achievement Award: 2014
 France Football 47th Greatest Manager of All Time: 2019

References

External links
 Raymond Goethals on www.belgium.be in Dutch/French and English
 Raymond Goethals' obituary on UEFA.com
 The magician remembered' by Berend Scholten on UEFA.com

1921 births
2004 deaths
People from Forest, Belgium
Belgian footballers
Association football goalkeepers
R. Daring Club Molenbeek players
K.S.K. Ronse players
Belgian football managers
Sint-Truidense V.V. managers
Belgium national football team managers
R.S.C. Anderlecht managers
FC Girondins de Bordeaux managers
São Paulo FC managers
Standard Liège managers
Vitória S.C. managers
Racing Jet Wavre managers
Olympique de Marseille managers
Belgian Pro League managers
Ligue 1 managers
Campeonato Brasileiro Série A managers
Primeira Liga managers
UEFA Champions League winning managers
1970 FIFA World Cup managers
UEFA Euro 1972 managers
Belgian expatriate football managers
Belgian expatriate sportspeople in France
Belgian expatriate sportspeople in Brazil
Belgian expatriate sportspeople in Portugal
Expatriate football managers in France
Expatriate football managers in Brazil
Expatriate football managers in Portugal
Deaths from colorectal cancer
Footballers from Brussels